John-Patrick Tracey "JP" Smith (born 24 January 1989) is an Australian professional tennis player who competes mainly on the ATP Challenger Tour, both in singles and doubles. He attended the University of Tennessee from 2007 through 2011 where he was a four-time All-American and made it to the college No. 1 ranking in both singles and doubles. Smith reached his highest ATP singles ranking of No. 108 on 28 September 2015, and his highest ATP doubles ranking of No. 52 on 11 September 2017.

In July 2015, Smith won his maiden ATP Tour match defeating fellow Aussie Bernard Tomic in the first round of the Hall of Fame Championships in Newport. He went on to reach the semifinals.

In 2019, he reached the final of the Australian Open mixed doubles alongside fellow Aussie Astra Sharma.

College career
Knoxville became Smith's home away from home when he enrolled at the University of Tennessee in August 2007. It was on those campus' hardcourts that he became one of the most prolific athletes in Tennessee and Intercollegiate Tennis Association history.

Coached by Sam Winterbotham and American former tennis star Chris Woodruff, Smith became a mainstay in the college top 10 in singles and doubles while helping the Volunteers to their best four-year period in program history. Smith played No. 1 in the singles and doubles lineups nearly his entire career.  He was voted the Southeastern Conference Player of the Year in 2010 and 2011 as a junior and senior. As a team, Tennessee won the conference title both those years and reached the NCAA final in 2010. Smith eventually became the Vols' career combined wins leader with 298 (152 singles wins, 146 doubles wins).

He was consistently among the top tennis players year in, year out. He finished his career as the second player in college tennis history to earn singles and doubles ITA All-America honors all four years of his career, joining eventual world No. 1 doubles player Rick Leach of Southern California.

Smith enjoyed his best season as a junior in 2009–10. He swept the singles and doubles titles at the 2009 ITA All-American Championships, one of college tennis' "Grand Slams." His superb play during the fall's individual tournament season helped eventual propel Smith to the No. 1 national singles ranking on 17 April 2010. In addition to being ranked No. 1 in singles, he also held the No. 1 ITA national doubles ranking during portions of the 2009, 2010 and 2011 seasons. He was part of the ITA National Doubles Team of the Year with Davey Sandgren in 2009 and Boris Conkic in 2011. He reached the NCAA finals in doubles with Sandgren in 2010 and 2011.

One of Smith's major career accomplishments at Tennessee came off the court entirely. He earned his undergraduate degree in economics in May 2011. He was an academic award winner for the Vols, year in, year out. He earned an NCAA Postgraduate Scholarship and was a three-time ITA Academic Scholar Athlete.

2011 SEC Athlete of the Year
A month after his college career ended, Smith became the first Vol since Peyton Manning in 1998 to be voted SEC Athlete of the Year by conference athletic directors. Other male athletes from Tennessee to earn this honor at the time included baseball star Todd Helton (1995) and football wide receiver Larry Seivers (1977).

Professional career

2012
In April, Smith won the US F11, defeating Pedro Zerbini 6–2, 6–0 in the final.
In July 2012, Smith won the Winnetka Challenger against Ricardas Berankis 3–6, 6–3, 7–6 in the final. This was his first Challenger title, which he also had to qualify.

2013
In 2013, Smith competed mostly on the Challenger Tour. 
His first title came on 25 August at the Canada F6, where he defeated Ante Pavic 3–6, 6–4, 6–3 in the final 
Smith also enjoyed a successful week in Tiburon; with his quarterfinal finish he vaulted 15 spots to a new career-high ranking of No.208.

2014
Smith made the second round of qualifying before losing to Denis Kudla in straight sets. 
He qualified for Indian Wells but lost in round one to Robin Haase.

Smith made the final of the Taipei Challenger, losing to Gilles Müller 3–6, 3–6. This increased his ranking to a career high of No. 181. He lost in the first round of Wimbledon qualifying to Farrukh Dustov.
In the two Traralgon Challenger events, Smith lost in the semifinal to Bradley Klahn in 1 and in the quarterfinal to Ben Mitchell in 2.

In December, Smith narrowly missed out on a wildcard into the 2015 Australian Open, losing in the final of the Australian play off to Jordan Thompson 1–6, 3–6, 6–1, 7–6, 7–9. Smith ended 2014 with a ranking of 201.

2015: First ATP tour singles win and semifinal, Career-high ranking in singles

Smith commenced 2015 at the inaugural Onkaparina Challenger, but lost in round one to Marcos Baghdatis. He  was eliminated in the second round of qualifying for the Australian Open to compatriot Omar Jasika 7–6, 3–6, 10–12. In February, Smith headed to USA where he made the quarter final of the Dallas Challenger. He then played and qualified for the Delray Beach main draw. This was fourth ATP World Tour event for which he has qualified. He drew No.1 seed Kevin Anderson and lost in round one. Smith lost in round one of qualifying for Indian Wells before returning to the Challenger Tour, where he won the Drummondville Challenger over crowd favourite, Frank Dancevic. This was his second career Challenger title and first since 2012. This win gave Smith a near career high of 163. In June, Smith secured his first Grand Slam main-draw entry via qualifying for the first time in his career at Wimbledon. He lost in round one to Kenny de Schepper in five sets, despite leading 2–0 sets.

In July, Smith entered the Newport Championships and defeated compatriot and third seed Bernard Tomic in round one, his first win on the ATP World Tour on the way to the semifinal where he lost to eventual champion Rajeev Ram. At the US Open, Smith qualified before losing to Mikhail Youzhny in round one. He reached a career-high ranking of No. 108 on 28 September 2015. Smith ended 2015 with a singles ranking of No. 129.

2016
Smith began 2016 with a wildcard into the 2016 Brisbane International. He lost in round one. Smith made the second round of qualifying at the Australian Open. In February, Smith qualified for Delray and defeated world No. 26 and No. 3 seed Ivo Karlović in round one. He lost to Juan Martín del Potro in round two. He lost in the qualifying rounds of Mexican Open, Indian Wells and Miami Masters. In April and May, Smith returned to the Challenger Circuit across Asia and Europe with limited success. In June, Smith lost in round one of Wimbledon qualifying. In July, Smith defeated compatriot Jordan Thompson in the first round of the Hall of Fame Tennis Championship, but lost to Marco Chiudinelli in round two. Smith lost in round one of US Open qualifying before returning to the Challenger Tour in USA and Australia in September, October and November. Smith ended 2016 with a singles ranking of No. 226.

2017: First Grand Slam doubles quarterfinal
Smith began 2017 narrowly missing out on qualifying for 2017 Brisbane International and 2017 Australian Open, before playing a number of Challengers in North America. His best result being a semi-final result at Drummondville in March. In April, Smith travelled to Europe and lost in the first round of qualifying for the 2017 French Open and in June at the Surbiton Challenger before qualifying for and making the quarterfinals of the Nottingham Challenger. At Wimbledon, Smith lost in the last round of qualifying, 10–12 in the fifth set.

In August, Smith qualified for the Cincinnati Masters but lost to Richard Gasquet in round one. In September, Smith reached the doubles quarterfinals 2017 US Open partnering Nicholas Monroe.

2018: First ATP World Tour doubles title
Smith commenced the season qualifying for the 2018 Brisbane International. He lost in round one to Mischa Zverev. Smith lost in the final round of qualifying for the Australian Open.

In March, Smith travelled to the U.S. and played on the Challenger Tour, reaching the final of the León Challenger in Mexico. In May, Smith lost in the qualifying for the French Open. In June, Smith qualified for and lost in round one of 2018 Wimbledon Championships.

In July, Smith won his first ATP World Tour doubles title in Atlanta Open partnering again with American Nicholas Monroe with whom he also reached earlier in February the final at the 2018 Delray Beach Open. Smith competed on the Challenger Tour for the rest of 2018 with limited success.

2019: Australian Open mixed doubles final
In January 2019 John-Patrick Smith alongside fellow Australian Astra Sharma reached the final of the Australian Open mixed doubles. The most notable of their victories on this run came against second seeds Bruno Soares and Nicole Melichar in straight sets, before eventually losing 6-7, 1-6 to Barbora Krejčíková and Rajeev Ram in the final. John continued his form in men's doubles later in the year, making nine Challenger finals and winning the 2019 Challenger Eckental and 2019 Puerto Vallarta Open.

2020-2021: Second Grand Slam doubles quarterfinal
In December 2019, Smith won the Australian Wildcard Playoff to earn direct entry in singles into the 2020 Australian Open. He lost in the first round to Guido Pella. In the mixed doubles, he partnered again with Astra Sharma, and they reached the semifinals in Melbourne. 

The following year, he reached the quarterfinals in doubles as a wildcard at the 2021 Australian Open partnering fellow Australian Matthew Ebden, his best showing at this major and only his second quarterfinal in doubles in his career.

Grand Slam finals

Mixed doubles: 1 (runner-up)

ATP career finals

Doubles: 5 (1 title, 4 runner-ups)

Challenger and Futures finals

Singles: 11 (5–6)

Doubles: 69 (34 titles, 35 runner-ups)

Performance timelines

Current through the 2022 Adelaide International 1.

Singles

Doubles

References

External links
 
 
 
 John-Patrick Smith at Tennis Explorer
 

1989 births
Living people
Australian expatriate sportspeople in the United States
Australian male tennis players
Sportspeople from Townsville
Tennessee Volunteers men's tennis players
Tennis people from Queensland